Puerto Rico Highway 38 (PR-38) is an urban route lying entirely in the Puerto Rican capital city of San Juan. PR-38 is co-extensive with Covadonga Passage.

Major intersections

See also

 List of highways numbered 38

References

External links
 

038
Roads in San Juan, Puerto Rico